Hamilton City (formerly, Hamilton) is a census-designated place (CDP) in Glenn County, California, United States. The population was 1,759 at the 2010 census, down from 1,903 at the 2000 census. The community is inside area code 530. The default prefix used for wired telephones in the Hamilton City area is 826. The postal ZIP Code is 95951.

Signature features
The community is located along the Sacramento River near Mile 199. Hamilton Union High School is well known locally because of its sports and agricultural program as well as being recognized as a California Distinguished School.
The large silos of the former Holly Sugar Plant (formerly served by California Northern Railroad) are visible from all over town. 

Geography

Climate
According to the Köppen Climate Classification system, Hamilton City has a warm-summer Mediterranean climate, abbreviated "Csa" on climate maps.

History
The town began in 1905 with the founding of a large sugar beet processing plant later belonging to Holly Sugar Corporation.  What is known today as the Holly Sugar Plant was built in 1906 by James Hamilton and the Alta California Sugar Beet Company.  The name of the company was changed in 1908 to Sacramento Valley Sugar Company.  It was sold in 1936 to Spreckels Sugar Company, which is the parent company of Holly Sugar.  Spreckels was later purchased by Imperial Sugar The first post office at Hamilton City opened in 1906. As the population of the town grew, to make room for development the local cemetery was moved to a new location about 10 miles north of Artois, California.

The sugar plant closed in 2006.

Demographics

2010
At the 2010 census Hamilton City had a population of 1,759. The racial makeup of Hamilton City was 834 (47.4%) White, 18 (1.0%) African American, 23 (1.3%) Native American, 15 (0.9%) Asian, 0 (0.0%) Pacific Islander, 804 (45.7%) from other races, and 65 (3.7%) from two or more races. Hispanic or Latino of any race were 1,489 persons (84.7%).

The whole population lived in households, no one lived in non-institutionalized group quarters and no one was institutionalized.

There were 510 households, 269 (52.7%) had children under the age of 18 living in them, 304 (59.6%) were opposite-sex married couples living together, 79 (15.5%) had a female householder with no husband present, 48 (9.4%) had a male householder with no wife present.  There were 40 (7.8%) unmarried opposite-sex partnerships, and 5 (1.0%) same-sex married couples or partnerships. 54 households (10.6%) were one person and 24 (4.7%) had someone living alone who was 65 or older. The average household size was 3.45.  There were 431 families (84.5% of households); the average family size was 3.66.

The age distribution was 530 people (30.1%) under the age of 18, 203 people (11.5%) aged 18 to 24, 493 people (28.0%) aged 25 to 44, 359 people (20.4%) aged 45 to 64, and 174 people (9.9%) who were 65 or older.  The median age was 29.6 years. For every 100 females, there were 103.8 males.  For every 100 females age 18 and over, there were 106.6 males.

There were 539 housing units at an average density of ,of which 510 were occupied, 289 (56.7%) by the owners and 221 (43.3%) by renters.  The homeowner vacancy rate was 2.0%; the rental vacancy rate was 5.1%.  947 people (53.8% of the population) lived in owner-occupied housing units and 812 people (46.2%) lived in rental housing units.

2000
At the 2000 census there were 1,903 people, 513 households, and 431 families in the CDP. The racial makeup of the CDP was 38.10% White, 0.37% Black or African American, 1.21% Native American, 0.32% Asian, 56.38% from other races, and 3.63% from two or more races.  80.56% of the population were Hispanic or Latino of any race.
Of the 513 households 52.0% had children under the age of 18 living with them, 64.9% were married couples living together, 11.7% had a female householder with no husband present, and 15.8% were non-families. 10.5% of households were one person and 4.7% were one person aged 65 or older.  The average household size was 3.71 and the average family size was 4.00.

The age distribution was 33.4% under the age of 18, 12.6% from 18 to 24, 28.3% from 25 to 44, 18.5% from 45 to 64, and 7.2% 65 or older.  The median age was 28 years. For every 100 females, there were 106.0 males.  For every 100 females age 18 and over, there were 113.1 males.

The median household income was $33,169 and the median family income  was $34,167. Males had a median income of $20,405 versus $14,191 for females. The per capita income for the CDP was $9,047.  About 17.5% of families and 20.6% of the population were below the poverty line, including 29.0% of those under age 18 and 9.2% of those age 65 or over.

Politics

Education
The Hamilton Union High School District and Hamilton Union Elementary School Districts unified in 2009 to become the Hamilton Unified School District.  Longtime Hamilton Union High School Principal/Superintendent Ray Odom served as the first Superintendent of the new Hamilton Unified School District.  Mr. Odom retired in 2011.  The current Superintendent is Charles Tracy and the current High School Principal is Cris Oseguera.  Hamilton Unified School District includes Hamilton High School, Hamilton Elementary School, Ella Barkley High School, Hamilton Adult School, Hamilton High Community Day School, and Hamilton Elementary Community Day School.

Emergency services
Law enforcement is provided by the Glenn County Sheriff's Department.

Fire services are provided by the Hamilton City Fire Protection District which covers the town as well as the surrounding area, including a mutual aid agreement with Butte County Fire, the Capay Volunteer Fire Department and Ord Bend Volunteer Fire Department, eight miles south.

The Fire District consists of a full-time fire chief, a part-time division chief, and volunteer firefighters. Dispatch services for HCFPD are provided by the Tehama-Glenn Unit Headquarters of the California Department of Forestry and Fire Protection in Red Bluff.

Notable people
Kyle Lohse - Major League Baseball (MLB) pitcher for the Milwaukee Brewers attended Hamilton Union High School.
 Rigoberto Sanchez - National Football League (NFL) punter for the Indianapolis Colts attended Hamilton Union High School.

References

Census-designated places in Glenn County, California
Populated places established in 1905
Census-designated places in California
Populated places on the Sacramento River
1905 establishments in California